Luis Fernando Tena Garduño (born 20 January 1958) is a Mexican professional football manager and former player who is the head coach of the Guatemala national team.

Coaching career
After retiring as a player, Tena began his coaching career in 1994 with Cruz Azul, a squad which he has guided on three occasions. Aside from stints at Cruz Azul and Morelia, Tena has coached Santos Laguna, Chiapas and Tecos UAG. His brother, Alfredo Tena, a former Club América player and manager, served as an assistant coach for Luis. On 16 March 2008 Tena was named the new coach of Monarcas Morelia, he was fired on 20 February 2009 and was later named as the head coach to Chiapas on 6 May 2009.

After a slow start to Primera División de México Bicentenario 2010 tournament, Tena was later let go from his head coach position from Chiapas in early January, 2010.

On 7 September 2013 Mexico's Olympic gold medal-winning coach Luis Fernando Tena took temporary control of the Mexico national football team following the departure of Jose Manuel de la Torre.

On 11 September 2013, Tena was released as Mexico national team coach.

On 10 December 2013, Tena was confirmed as the new head coach of Cruz Azul for a fourth term. He signed a contract with Cruz Azul for 18 months. On May 29, 2015, Tena was fired from the club.

Honours

Manager
Cruz Azul
Mexican Primera División: Invierno 1997
CONCACAF Champions League: 1996, 1997, 2013–14

Morelia
Mexican Primera División: Invierno 2000

Mexico U23
Pan American Games: 2011
CONCACAF Olympic Qualifying Championship: 2012
Toulon Tournament: 2012
Olympic Gold Medal: 2012

Notes

References

External links
profile

Liga MX players
Association football midfielders
Atlético Español footballers
C.D. Guadalajara footballers
Atlante F.C. footballers
C.F. Oaxtepec footballers
Mexican football managers
Cruz Azul managers
Club América managers
Atlético Morelia managers
Santos Laguna managers
Tecos F.C. managers
Chiapas F.C. managers
Guatemala national football team managers
Mexico national football team managers
Querétaro F.C. managers
FC Juárez managers
2011 Copa América managers
Footballers from Mexico City
1958 births
Living people
Liga MX managers
Club León managers
C.D. Guadalajara managers
Mexican footballers